Tales Runner is a massively multiplayer online game created by the South Korean company Rhaon Entertainment and published by Smilegate. It combines the genres of social, fantasy and racing games; players compete by running, jumping, dashing, skiing and climbing across different magical fairy tale settings. The game setting is centered on Eastern and Western fairy tales.

Tales Runner has local servers for various countries including Korea, the United States,Thailand, Mainland China and Japan. On 16 November 2011, gPotato announced that their North American servers would permanently shut down on 21 December 2011. 

As of 29 October 2012, Nowcom, the primary company hosting TalesRunner, released their global server of the game again. TOT announced that transfer publishing license in Thailand to Asiasoft on 30 April 2016. OGPlanet, the company hosting the only English server of Tales Runner announced that their servers would close permanently on 20 April 2017.

Storyline 
King Henry is the king of a beautiful country. To make the people happy again, he started the "Fairyland Sightseeing Racing Competition" with a fairy tale theme. The winners of the competition will be awarded a stone that can fulfill any wish. Each contestant is called a "Tales Runner".

Gameplay

Racing 
Racing is a key part of Tales Runner. Players race though various racing maps in an effort to finish the map and collect money, experience points, Alchemy Cards, and various items. There is a variety of map styles ranging from training maps resembling sports facilities, fantasy maps themed around fairy tales stories, or survival races with monsters to conquer.

The game supports several racing modes, including individual races where each player runs for himself, team mode with two teams, and relay mode with up to six teams of three players. There's also a mode for up to 30 players racing as well as a Tournament Mode for special events, and also a 8 players co-operate to finish the race. Racing rewards differ dependent on the position at which the player or its team finished. Rewards consist of game currency award, experience points award and randomly in other items used in other game features.

Characters 
Tales Runner currently supports eighteen different customizable playable characters with different stats. Players may have as many or as few characters as they wish, and once purchased are permanent additions to a players My Room. All game servers don't support all the playable characters. In addition, there are transformation characters used to "disguise" a playable character as a person from a fairytale, as well as special characters for the character Maki, in the shape of ghosts. Characters are purchased in-game using either TR, or Astros (USA Tales Runner) currency or cash for Thailand and Korean servers.

Experience 
Experience gained in racing or using other means allows the player to level up. Character abilities can also be improved using special equipment or clothing items, or with buffs from NPCs, event prizes, or fortune telling. Experience gained via racing is also used in improving some player's belongings or allow special interactions with the items, for instance, Experience gained can level up pets, farm animals, and growable farm crops. Farm animals and farm crops can be harvested for various items, Experience, or money.

Currency 
There are two currencies available in the game: A 'cash' currency, which can only be obtained using real money, and the in-game currency called TR, which can be obtained via racing, with a variety of farm items, or purchased by tickets with cash currency.
Shop items available for purchase are usually only available for one of the currencies. Players can buy items for other players. After the purchase of an item, the item can never change owners. Playable characters used for racing are also inventory items – new characters can be bought in a shop, and the selection of active character does not change the player's in-game name, experience count, or money balance.

Alchemy 
Alchemy allows players to create new items by combining various cards obtained via racing with items bought in shops. The alchemy system also supports upgrading lower level equipment to a higher level. Each alchemy item supports a different stat, and is able to increase that stat. Players in Tales Runner can have couples, marriages, and family. They can purchase it with cash currency.

Players can form guilds with other players in addition to being in families; these are similar to the guild system in some other MMORPGs. There are daily quests and race battles that are exclusive to only Guilds members. Details vary depending on the servers.

Farm 
Farms are miniature maps a player can own, maintain, and use for meeting with other players. It is possible to use permanent items on maps for decorative purposes, or growable items which produce other useful items the player can use. Growable items use experience points obtained by the player in races but don't prevent or slow down the character leveling up. Growable items expire after certain amount of using and either disappear or must be renewed to continue working. The farm needs a farm ticket to be used so it doesn't expire; this ticket is bought with in-game currency, TR.

Achievements 
Achievements are small quests or tasks which player can accomplish while playing the game. Examples are racing certain number of races, performing certain number of racing tricks, or buying certain number of items in the in-game shop. Completing an achievement is rewarded with various amounts of in-game currency.

Tournaments and events 
In tournaments and events, players compete against each other for points and prizes, varying depending on the server and event. Usually, a GM (Game Master/Manager) will host the event from in-game and dispatch the prizes.

The 2013 Tales Runner World Championships was hosted in a Mall in Hong Kong.

References 

Multiplayer online games
Fantasy sports video games
Video games with cel-shaded animation
Racing video games
Video games developed in South Korea
Massively multiplayer online role-playing games
2005 video games
Windows games
Windows-only games
Smilegate games
Asiasoft games
OGPlanet games